Zbigniew Płaszewski (born 18 August 1951) is a Polish footballer. He played in five matches for the Poland national football team from 1976 to 1980.

References

External links
 

1951 births
Living people
Polish footballers
Poland international footballers
Place of birth missing (living people)
Association footballers not categorized by position